The California Court Case Management System (CCMS) is the court case management system intended for use by the several courts of the judiciary of California, which includes the Supreme Court, 6 Courts of Appeal, and 58 Superior Courts.

Fees

Pursuant to California Rule of Court 2.506 and Government Code Section 68150(h), courts may impose fees for the costs of providing access to its electronic records.

Several superior courts do so, including Alameda, Los Angeles, Riverside, Sacramento, and San Diego, and the fees have been criticized by Thomas Peele as exorbitant and extraordinarily high, with the Alameda County Superior Court fees being the subject of a MoveOn.org petition.

Implementation
Five Superior Courts—in Orange, Sacramento, San Diego, San Joaquin, and Ventura Counties—use CCMS version 3 to process civil cases. This represents approximately 25 percent of the civil case volume in California. Fresno is the only Superior Court still using version 2 of CCMS. In August 2013, the Judicial Council approved funding for a system that will replace CCMS version 2 in Fresno.

History
In 2002, the California Administrative Office of the Courts (AOC) started the Second-Generation Electronic Filing Specification (2GEFS) project.

After a $200,000 consultant's report declared the project ready for a final push, the Judicial Council of California scrapped the program in 2012 after $500 million in costs.

Technical
The 2GEFS Court Filing 2.0 specification was based on experiences with the Legal XML Court Filing 1.0 (before it became OASIS Legal XML).

Related
On 10 December 2012 it was announced that the San Luis Obispo County Superior Court would use the Odyssey® court case management system from Tyler Technologies.

See also
 Case Management/Electronic Case Files (CM/ECF), the case management and electronic case files system for most of the United States Federal Courts
 New York State Courts Electronic Filing System (NYSCEF), the e-filing system for New York
 MassCourts, the case management system for Massachusetts
 PACER, an electronic public access service of United States federal court documents

References

External links
 California Court Case Management System (CCMS)

California state courts
Government databases in the United States
Online law databases
Legal software
E-government